The Sedleian Professor of Natural Philosophy is the name of a chair at the Mathematical Institute of the University of Oxford.

Overview
The Sedleian Chair was founded by Sir William Sedley who, by his will dated 20 October 1618, left the sum of £2,000 to the University of Oxford for purchase of lands for its endowment. Sedley's bequest took effect in 1621 with the purchase of an estate at Waddesdon in Buckinghamshire to produce the necessary income.

It is regarded as the oldest of Oxford's scientific chairs.  Holders of the Sedleian Professorship have, since the mid 19th century, worked in a range of areas of applied mathematics and mathematical physics.  They are simultaneously elected to fellowships at Queen's College, Oxford.

The Sedleian Professors in the past century have been Augustus Love (1899-1940), who was distinguished for his work in the mathematical theory of elasticity, Sydney Chapman (1946-1953), who is renowned for his contributions to the kinetic theory of gases and solar-terrestrial physics, George Temple (1953-1968), who made significant contributions to mathematical physics and the theory of generalized functions, Brooke Benjamin (1979-1995), who did highly influential work in the areas of mathematical analysis and fluid mechanics, and Sir John Ball (1996-2019), who is distinguished for his work in the mathematical theory of elasticity, materials science, the calculus of variations, and infinite-dimensional dynamical systems.

List of Sedleian Professors

Notes

References

Bibliography
Oxford Dictionary of National Biography, articles on Lapworth, Edwards, Wallis, Millington, Browne, Hornsby, Cooke, Price, Love, Chapman, Temple, Brook Benjamin.

Professorships in mathematics
Professorships at the University of Oxford
1621 establishments in England
Mathematics education in the United Kingdom
Lists of people associated with the University of Oxford
The Queen's College, Oxford